Hundun is both a "legendary faceless being" in Chinese mythology and the "primordial and central chaos" in Chinese cosmogony, comparable with the world egg.

Linguistics
Hundun  was semantically extended from a mythic "primordial chaos; nebulous state of the universe before heaven and earth separated" to mean "unintelligible; chaotic; messy; mentally dense; innocent as a child".

Hùn "chaos; muddled; confused" is written either hùn or hún. These two are interchangeable graphic variants read as hún and hùn  "nebulous; stupid" (hùndùn ). Dùn ("dull; confused") is written as either dùn or dūn.

Isabelle Robinet outlines the etymological origins of hundun.
Semantically, the term hundun is related to several expressions, hardly translatable in Western languages, that indicate the void or a barren and primal immensity – for instance, hunlun , hundong , kongdong , menghong , or hongyuan . It is also akin to the expression "something confused and yet complete" (huncheng ) found in the Daode jing 25, which denotes the state prior to the formation of the world where nothing is perceptible, but which nevertheless contains a cosmic seed. Similarly, the state of hundun is likened to an egg; in this usage, the term alludes to a complete world round and closed in itself, which is a receptacle like a cavern (dong ) or a gourd (hu  or hulu ).  

Most Chinese characters are written using "radicals" or "semantic elements" and "phonetic elements". Hùndùn "primordial chaos" is cognate with Wonton (húntun) "wonton; dumpling soup" written with the "eat radical" . Note that the English loanword wonton is borrowed from the Cantonese pronunciation wan4tan1. Mair suggests a fundamental connection between hundun and wonton: "The undifferentiated soup of primordial chaos. As it begins to differentiate, dumpling-blobs of matter coalesce. … With the evolution of human consciousness and reflectiveness, the soup was adopted as a suitable metaphor for chaos" . This last assertion appears unsupported however, since wonton soup is not attested in Chinese sources dating earlier than the Han dynasty , although the linguistic connection of the soup to the larger concept certainly appears real.

Hundun  has a graphic variant hunlun  (using lún  see the Liezi below), which etymologically connects to the mountain name Kunlun  (differentiated with the "mountain radical" ).  says "Kunlun and hundun are the same closed center of the world."
 
 quotes the Chinese philologist Lo Mengci , who says that reduplicated words like hundun "suggest cyclic movement and transformation", and speculates: 
Ritually mumbling the sounds of hun-tun might, therefore, be said to have a kind on incantatory significance that both phonetically and morphologically invokes the mythological and ontological idea of the Tao as the creatio continua process of infinitely repeated moments of change and new creation.

The Shuowen Jiezi does not enter dun  (which apparently lacked a pre-Han Seal script). It defines hun  as fengliu  "abundantly flow", hun  as the sound of hunliu  "abundantly-flowing flow" or "seemingly impure", dun  as "anger, rage; scolding" or "who", and lun  as "ripples; eddies" or "sink into; disappear".

English chaos is a better translation of hundun in the classical sense of Chaos or Khaos in Greek mythology meaning "gaping void; formless primordial space preceding creation of the universe" than in the common sense of "disorder; confusion". The latter meaning of hundun is synonymous with Chinese luàn. Their linguistic compound hùnluàn ( lit. "chaos-chaos", meaning "chaos; disorder; confusion) exemplifies the "synonym compound" category in Chinese morphology.

Early textual usages
In the Chinese written record, hundun first appears in classics dating from the Warring States period. The following summary divides them into Confucianist, Daoist, and other categories, and presents them in roughly chronological order, with the caveat that many early textual dates are uncertain.

Confucian texts
Hundun only occurs in one Confucian classic, the Zuo zhuan commentary to the Spring and Autumn Annals. Most early Confucianist ancient texts (Lunyu, Book of Documents, I Ching, etc.) do not use hun, with four exceptions. One, the Mengzi, uses hun in its original meaning "sound of flowing water". Mencius explains why Confucius praised water, "There is a spring of water; how it gushes out!" . The other three use hun as what  calls "a term of opprobrium and condemnation related to the suppression of the "barbarians" or the "legendary rebels"." 
The Shijing (237) mentions Hunyi  "ancient Hunni tribe in Turan". When King Wen of Zhou opened up the roads, "The hordes of the Keun [sic] disappeared, Startled and panting". The Chunqiu mentions the Luhun  tribe of the Rong  people, "the Jung of Luh-hwăn" . The Zuozhuan commentary to the Chunqiu notes they were originally from western Gansu and forced into northern Henan.

Another Zuozhuan context refers to Hundun  as a worthless son of the Yellow Emperor, one of the mythical Sixiong  "Four Fiends" banished by Shun.
 The ancient emperor Hung [Hwang-te] had a descendant devoid of ability [and virtue]. He hid righteousness from himself, and was a villain at heart; he delighted in the practice of the worst vices; he was shameless and vile, obstinate, stupid, and unfriendly, cultivating only the intimacy of such as himself. All the people under heaven called him Chaos. … When Shun became Yaou's minister, he received the nobles from the four quarters of the empire, and banished these four wicked ones, Chaos, Monster, Block, and Glutton, casting them out into the four distant regions, to meet the spite of the sprites and evil things .
The other "fiends" are Qiongqi , Taowu , and Taotie . Legge notes this passage "is worthy of careful study in many respects."

 contrasts these rare Confucian usages of hundun pejoratively suggesting the forces thwarting civilization, "the "birds and beasts," barbarian tribes, banished ministers, and legendary rebels)" with the common Daoist usages in a "paradise lost theme".

Taoist texts
Hundun commonly occurs in classics of philosophical Taoism. The Daodejing does not mention hundun but uses both hun graphic variants. One section  uses hun  "bemuddle": "The sage is self-effacing in his dealings with all under heaven, and bemuddles his mind for the sake of all under heaven" . Three other sections use hun: 
"These three cannot be fully fathomed, Therefore, They are bound together to make unity" .
"plain, as an unhewn log, muddled, as turbid waters, expansive, as a broad valley" 
"There was something featureless yet complete, born before heaven and earth" .

The Zhuangzi (ca. 3rd-2nd centuries BCE) has a famous parable involving emperors Hundun , Shu, and Hu.  cites Marcel Granet on Shu and Hu synonymously meaning "suddenness; quickness" and "etymologically appear to be linked to the images of lightning and thunder, or analogously, flaming arrows." The "Heavenly Questions" chapter of the Chu Ci uses Shu and Hu as one name: "Where are the hornless dragons which carry bears on their backs for sport? Where is the great serpent with nine heads and where is the Shu-Hu?" 
The emperor of the South Sea was called Shu [Brief], the emperor of the North Sea was called Hu [Sudden], and the emperor of the central region was called Hun-tun [Chaos]. Shu and Hu from time to time came together for a meeting in the territory of Hun-tun, and Hun-tun treated them very generously. Shu and Hu discussed how they could repay his kindness. "All men," they said, "have seven openings so they can see, hear, eat, and breathe. But Hun-tun alone doesn't have any. Let's trying boring him some!" Every day they bored another hole, and on the seventh day Hun-tun died. 
Compare Watson's renderings of the three characters with other Zhuangzi translators.
Change, Suddenness, Confusion (or Chaos) — Frederic H. Balfour 
Shû, Hû, Chaos — James Legge 
Change, Uncertainty, Primitivity — Yu-Lan Fung 
Shu, Hu, Hun Tun — Herbert Giles 
Immediately, Suddenly, Undifferentiation — James R. Ware 
Light, Darkness, Primal Chaos — Gia-Fu Feng and Jane English 
Fast, Furious, Hun-t'un — A.C. Graham 
Lickety, Split, Wonton — Victor H. Mair 
Change, Dramatic, Chaos — Martin Palmer 
Helter, Skelter, Chaos — Wang Rongpei

Two other Zhuangzi contexts use hundun. Chapter 11 has an allegory about Hong Meng  "Big Concealment" or "Silly Goose", who "was amusing himself by slapping his thighs and hopping around like a sparrow", which  interprets as shamanic dancing comparable with the Shanhaijing below. Hong Meng poetically reduplicates hunhun-dundun in describing Daoist "mind-nourishment" meditation. 
"You have only to rest in inaction and things will transform themselves. Smash your form and body, spit out hearing and eyesight, forget you are a thing among other things, and you may join in great unity with the deep and boundless. Undo the mind, slough off spirit, be blank and soulless, and the ten thousand things one by one will return to the root – return to the root and not know why. Dark and undifferentiated chaos – to the end of life none will depart from it. But if you try to know it, you have already departed from it. Do not ask what its name is, do not try to observe its form. Things will live naturally and of themselves." 
Chapter 12 tells a story about the Confucian disciple Zigong becoming dumbfounded after meeting a Daoist sage. He reported back to Confucius, who denigrated Hundun Shi zhi shu  "the arts of Mr. Chaos [Hundun]":
"He is one of those bogus practitioners of the arts of Mr. Chaos. He knows the first thing but doesn't understand the second. He looks after what is on the inside but doesn't look after what is on the outside. A man of true brightness and purity who can enter into simplicity, who can return to the primitive through inaction, give body to his inborn nature, and embrace his spirit, and in this way wander through the everyday world – if you had met one like that, you would have had real cause for astonishment. As for the arts of Mr. Chaos, you and I need not bother to find out about them."  

The Huainanzi has one occurrence of hundun  in a cosmological description.
Heaven and earth were perfectly joined [tung-t'ung ], all was chaotically unformed [hun-tun wei p'u ]; and things were complete [ch'eng ] yet not created. This is called [the time or condition] of the Great One. [t'ai-i ]. All came from this unity which gave to each thing its differences: the birds, fish, and beasts. This is called the lot [or division, fen ] of things.  
Three other Huainanzi chapters use hun, for example, the compound hunhun cangcang
The world was a unity without division into classes nor separation into orders (lit: a disorganised mass): the unaffectedness and homeliness of the natural heart had not, as yet, been corrupted: the spirit of the age was a unity, and all creation was in great affluence. Hence, if a man with the knowledge of I [ A mythical person of great powers] appeared, the world had no use for him.  

The Liezi uses hunlun  for hundun, which is described as the confused state in which qi  "pneuma; breath", xing  "form; shape", and zhi  "matter; substance" have begun to exist but are still merged as one.
There was a Primal Simplicity, there was a Primal Commencement, there were Primal Beginnings, there was a Primal Material. The Primal Simplicity preceded the appearance of the breath. The Primal Beginnings were the breath beginning to assume shape. The Primal Material was the breath when it began to assume substance. Breath, shape and substance were complete, but things were not yet separated from each other; hence the name "Confusion." "Confusion" means the myriad things were confounded and not yet separated from each other.

Other texts
The Shanhaijing collection of early myths and legends uses hundun  as an adjective to describe a shen  "spirit; god" on Tian Shan  "Heaven Mountain".
There is a god here who looks like a yellow sack. He is scarlet like cinnabar fire. He has six feet and four wings. He is Muddle Thick. He has no face and no eyes. He knows how to sing and dance. He is in truth the great god Long River.  
In the above passage, 渾敦 is translated as "Muddle Thick", and the name of the god  (Di-Jiang) is translated as "great god Long River". Toshihiko Izutsu (cited in ) suggests that singing and dancing here and in Zhuangzi refers to shamanic trance-inducing ceremonies, "the monster is said to be a bird, which is most probably an indication that the shamanistic dancing here in question was some kind of feather dance in which the shaman was ritually ornamented with a feathered headdress."

The Shen yi jing  "Classic of Divine Wonders" records a later variation of Hundun mythology. It describes him as a divine dog who lived on Mt. Kunlun, the mythical mountain at the center of the world.
It has eyes but can't see, walks without moving; and has two ears but can't hear. It has the knowledge of a man yet its belly is without the five internal organs and, although having a rectum, it doesn't evacuate food. It punches virtuous men and stays with the non-virtuous. It is called. Hun-tun.

Quoting the Zuo zhuan, Hun-tun was Meng-shih's untalented son. He always gnaws his tail, going round and round. Everyone ridiculed him. 

A poem in the Tang dynasty collection Hanshan refers to the Zhuangzi myth and reminisces about Hundun.
 How pleasant were our bodies in the days of Chaos, Needing neither to eat or piss! Who came along with his drill And bored us full of these nine holes? Morning after morning we must dress and eat; Year after year, fret over taxes. A thousand of us scrambling for a penny, We knock our heads together and yell for dear life.  
Note the addition of two holes (anus and penis) to the original seven (eyes, ears, nostrils, and mouth).

Interpretations
Hundun myths have a complex history, with many variations on the "primordial chaos" theme and associations with other legends.

The sociologist and historian Wolfram Eberhard analyzed the range of various hundun myths . He treated it as a World egg mythic "chain" from the southern Liao culture, which originated in the Sichuan and Hubei region.
Hundun creation myths involving humanity being born from a "thunder-egg" or lump of flesh, the son of an emperor, the Thunder god represented as a dog with bat wings, localized with the Miao people and Tai peoples.
The animal Lei "is a creature like a lump, without head, eyes, hands, or feet. At midnight it produces noises like thunder." 
The hundun dumplings, etymologically connected with "round", "unorganized; chaotic", and perhaps the "round mountain" Kunlun.
The world-system huntian  in ancient Chinese astronomy conceptualized the universe as a round egg and the earth as a yolk swimming within it.
The sack and the shooting of the god connects sack-like descriptions of hundun, perhaps with "sack" denoting "testicles", legends about Shang Dynasty king Wu Yi who lost a game of chess with the god Heaven and suspended a sack filled with blood and shot arrows at it, and later traditions of shooting at human dolls.
Pangu  is the mythological creator of the universe, also supposedly shaped like a sack, connected with dog mythologies, and who grew into a giant in order to separate Heaven and Earth. 
Heaven and earth as marital partners within the world-egg refers to the theme of Sky father and Earth Mother goddess.
Zhongli  is identified with Zhu Rong  "god of fire", which is a mythology from the southern state Chu, with variations appearing as two gods Zhong and Li.
Zhongli  clan, which has variant writings, originated in the Ba (state), near present-day Anhui. 
The brother-sister marriage is a complex of myths explaining the origins or mankind (or certain families), and their first child is usually a lump of flesh, which falls into pieces and populates the world. In later mythology, the brother Fu Xi and sister Nüwa, who lived on Mt. Kunlun, exemplify this marriage.

Norman J. Girardot, professor of Chinese religion at Lehigh University, has written articles and a definitive book on hundun. He summarizes this mythology as follows.
The hun-tun theme in early Taoism represents an ensemble of mythic elements coming from different cultural and religious situations. 
The symbolic coherence of the hun-tun theme in the Taoist texts basically reflects a creative reworking of a limited set of interrelated mythological typologies: especially the cosmic egg-gourd, the animal ancestor-cosmic giant, and primordial couple mythologies. The last two of these typologies are especially, although not exclusively, linked to what may be called the deluge cycle of mythology found primarily in southern local cultures. 
While there may also be a cultural connection between the southern deluge cycle and the cosmogonic scenario of the cosmic egg (i.e., via the "thunder-egg," "origin of ancestors [culture hero] from egg or gourd," and "origin of agriculture and mankind from gourd" myths), the fundamental linkage for all these typologies is the early Taoist, innovative perception of a shared symbolic intention that accounts for, and supports, a particular cosmogonic, metaphysical, and mystical vision of creation and life.

Interpretations of Hundun have expanded from "primordial chaos" into other realms. For instance, it is a keyword in Neidan "Chinese internal alchemy".  explains that "Alchemists begin their work by "opening" or "boring" hundun; in other words, they begin from the Origin, infusing its transcendent element of precosmic light into the cosmos in order to reshape it."

In popular culture
In the Marvel Cinematic Universe movie Shang-Chi and the Legend of the Ten Rings, the character Morris (vocal effects provided by Dee Bradley Baker) is a Hundun and acts as a companion of Trevor Slattery at the time when he was a jester for Wenwu.

In the roguelike platform game Spelunky 2, Hundun appears as a secret boss, taking the form of an egg with no facial features aside from one eye.

In the hack and slash game series Warriors Orochi, Hundun appears as a boss in 3 and a playable character in 4.  He has a anthropomorphic canine-like appearance with long white hair, four wings, and four arms each wielding a hatchet.

In the Iron Widow, Hunduns are giant alien robots made from spirit metal that constantly threaten the nation of Huaxia. At the novel's climax it is revealed the humans invaded their home world.

Hundun is also referenced at least linguistically in the Wild West-inspired RPG series Wild Arms, in which the Japanese pronunciation of Hundun ("Konton") is used. Several of the games contain a recurring extraterrestrial-like enemy called "Hayokonton." Rather than referring to the Chinese concept of chaos, it is possible that this enemy's name is intended to read "Haiyoru Konton," or the "Creeping Chaos," an epithet of the Lovecraftian entity Nyarlathotep.  The Western localization of Wild Arms 3 notably translates "Hayokonton" directly as "Creeping Chaos," suggesting this allusion.

The legendary Pokemon Chi-Yu, which first appeared in Pokemon Scarlet and Violet, is said to be based on Hundun.

See also
 Chaos (cosmogony) – bearing the similar name (both meaning "chaos" in Modern English) and appearing in the mythological primordial era
 Hongjun Laozu
 Tao
 Four Perils
 Tohu wa-bohu

Notes

References

External links
Chaos: A Thematic Continuity between Early Taoism and Taoist Inner Alchemy, Paul Crowe
In a Calabash, A Chinese Myth of Origins, Stephen Field
HUN-DUN, God Checker entry

Creation myths
Taoist cosmology
Chinese gods
Four Perils